Jackson Township is one of ten townships in Orange County, Indiana, United States. As of the 2010 census, its population was 686 and it contained 373 housing units.

History
Jackson Township was founded in 1831. It was named for President Andrew Jackson.

Geography

Cemeteries
The township contains these three cemeteries: Patoka Memorial, Cane Creek, Patoka Memorial and Swift.

Major highways
  Indiana State Road 145

Lakes
 Patoka Lake

School districts
 Springs Valley Community School Corporation

Political districts
 Indiana's 9th congressional district
 State House District 62
 State Senate District 48

References
 
 United States Census Bureau 2008 TIGER/Line Shapefiles
 IndianaMap

External links
 Indiana Township Association
 United Township Association of Indiana
 City-Data.com page for Jackson Township

Townships in Orange County, Indiana
Townships in Indiana